Tabanus miki also known as the plain-eyed brown horsefly is a species of biting horse-fly.

References

Tabanidae
Diptera of Europe
Insects described in 1880
Taxa named by Friedrich Moritz Brauer